Kochmes is the name of two rural localities under the administrative jurisdiction of the city of republic significance of Inta in the Komi Republic, Russia:
Kochmes, Kosyuvom Selo Administrative Territory, Inta, Komi Republic, a settlement in Kosyuvom Selo Administrative Territory; 
Kochmes, Verkhnyaya Inta, Inta, Komi Republic, a settlement under the administrative jurisdiction of Verkhnyaya Inta Urban-Type Settlement Administrative Territory;